Ulldecona is a town in the South of Catalonia, in Montsià (Terres de l'Ebre), near the Senia River. Ulldecona is part of the Taula del Sénia free association of municipalities. It has got town privileges since 1273.

The nearest towns are: Alcanar, Sant Carles de la Ràpita, Freginals, Godall, La Galera, Mas de Barberans and La Sénia in the Montsià region; and Vinaròs, Traiguera, Sant Jordi and Sant Rafel del Riu in Baix Maestrat. Important tourist areas are also nearby, such as Salou and Peñíscola.

Administrative divisions
The town has a main population centre and five smaller villages within its administrative perimeter: 
Ulldecona, 5286 
Els Valentins, 272 
El Castell, 257
Sant Joan del Pas, 173
Les Ventalles, 39 
La Miliana, 29

Economy
Traditional local agriculture was based on the produce of the numerous olive, almond and carob trees of the area, as well as fruit and vegetable crops.

Leaving aside the agricultural activities, the furniture, construction and service sectors are also of relative importance.

In recent years the quarrying of the stone of Ulldecona, a type of high quality marble, from the Serra de Godall hills has become a major income earner for the town.
Quarried since ancient times, the stone of Ulldecona has been used in the construction of important public works in Spain, such as the Pedrera in Barcelona, the Town Hall in Zaragoza and the airport of Madrid. Presently it is also exported to different countries, such as the US (Hilton Hotel in Los Angeles), France, Switzerland (Town Hall of Geneva), South Korea, Saudi Arabia and China.

Culture and social life
The most important customs of the people of Ulldecona are related to the staging of processions with gegants, musical bands and pubilles, as well as traditional dances and the releasing of bulls in the streets (bous).

The Passió d'Ulldecona is a yearly festival reenacting the Passion of Christ staged by local people, including a live donkey and real palm and olive branches.

Sports
One of the most important sports in Ulldecona is football. Ulldecona has its own football club, the Club de Futbol Ulldecona, with ten teams and 200 players. The first team plays nowadays in the 1a Regional League.
Other important sports are five-a-side football, basketball, twirling and table tennis. 
On the other hand, it is also very important the support that trial has in Ulldecona, bearing in mind that Adam Raga, from Ulldecona, has been the World Indoor Trial Champion in 2003, 2004 and 2005.

Current Southampton F.C. player and Champions  League Winner 2012 UEFA Champions League Final Oriol Romeu is a native of Ulldecona.

Spain international Aleix García Serrano of Manchester City also hails from the town.

Medieval Castle
The Medieval Castle, declared a Castle of Cultural Interest, can be found on the top of a hill known as Mount of the Castle, which is part of the Serra de Godall.
The visibility and the fertility and wealth of the land were features that increased the strategic value of this area.
The oldest remains that have been discovered show that that area was already populated during the Iberian era, between the 5th and the 1st centuries before Christ. Arabic peoples settled there during the 9th century and they started to build some of the buildings whose remains can be seen nowadays in the area. Ramón Berenguer IV conquered the south of the current territory of Catalonia in the 12th century and the medieval buildings started to be built.
The castle was inhabited until the end of the 13th century, when the people from Ulldecona started to settle in the plain.
In 1986, the Town Council bought the Castle.

See also 
 Ulldecona Dam

References

External links

 Official website 
 Government data pages 

Municipalities in Montsià
Populated places in Montsià